Clathroporina wainiana is a species of crustose lichen in the family Trichotheliaceae. It was formally described as a new species in 1902 by German lichenologist Alexander Zahlbruckner. The type was collected by Franz Xaver Rudolf von Höhnel in the Rio de Janeiro Botanical Garden. The species epithet honours Finnish lichenologist Edvard August Vainio.

Description
Clathroporina wainiana has a greenish-brown thallus with coarse warty protuberances, and pseudostromata–stroma in which fungal cells and remnants of host tissue are mixed. Each of these structures has a single black-walled pseudothecium. The asci produce two colourless ascospores, each measuring 150–220 by 40–55 μm.

References

Gyalectales
Lichen species
Lichens of South America
Lichens described in 1902
Taxa named by Alexander Zahlbruckner